Hammered may refer to:

Hammered (Motörhead album), a 2002 album by Motörhead
Hammered, a 2000 album by the Wicked Tinkers
Hammered (Bear novel), a 2005 novel by Elizabeth Bear
Hammered (Hearne novel), a 2011 novel by Kevin Hearne
Hammered coinage
Slang for getting drunk
 Hammer paint

See also
Hammer